Faith Macharia (born 9 February 1976, Nyeri, Kenya) is a Kenyan middle-distance runner who specializes in the 800 metres.

In 2001, she set a new Kenyan record over 1000 metres (2:35.39), still valid in 2007.

She trains with PACE Sports Management and is coached by Ricky Simms.

Competition record

Personal bests
800 metres - 1:58.34 min (2001)
1500 metres - 4:08.04 min (1999)

References

External links

Pace Sports Management

1976 births
Athletes (track and field) at the 2004 Summer Olympics
Kenyan female middle-distance runners
Living people
Olympic athletes of Kenya
People from Nyeri County
Athletes (track and field) at the 2002 Commonwealth Games
Commonwealth Games competitors for Kenya
Athletes (track and field) at the 2003 All-Africa Games
African Games competitors for Kenya
20th-century Kenyan women
21st-century Kenyan women